Jaded may refer to:

 Jaded (album), a 2003 album by To/Die/For
 Jaded (film), a 1998 film starring Carla Gugino
 Jaded, a 2002 skateboard film from Thrasher Magazine

Songs
 "Jaded" (Aerosmith song), 2000
 "Jaded" (Disclosure song), 2015
 "Jaded" (Drake song), 2018
 "Brain Stew" / "Jaded", by Green Day, 1996
 "Jaded", by Blindspott, from Blindspott
 "Jaded", by the Crystal Method from Vegas
 "Jaded", by deadmau5, B-side of "Faxing Berlin"
 "Jaded", by Kaash Paige, 2020
 "Jaded", by One Ok Rock from Ambitions, 2017
 "Jaded", by Operation Ivy from Energy
 "Jaded", by Paradise Lost from Draconian Times
 "Jaded", by Takida from ...Make You Breathe
 "Jaded (These Years)", by Mest from Mest

See also
 Jade (disambiguation)